Carex pauciflora, known as few-flowered sedge, is a perennial species of sedge in the family Cyperaceae native to Holarctic wetlands.
The specific epithet pauciflora, refers to the Latin term for 'few flowered'.

References

pauciflora
Plants described in 1777